Vungu, or Vumbu, is a Bantu language of Gabon.

References

Sira languages